Raashii Khanna (born 30 November 1990) is an Indian actress and playback singer who predominantly works in Telugu and Tamil film industries. She made her acting debut in a supporting role with the Hindi film Madras Cafe (2013) and subsequently made her debut as female lead with Telugu film Oohalu Gusagusalade (2014), in Tamil with Imaikkaa Nodigal (2018) and Malayalam with Villain (2017).

She has appeared in several commercially successful films like Bengal Tiger (2015), Supreme (2016), Jai Lava Kusa (2017), Tholi Prema (2018), Imaikkaa Nodigal (2018), Venky Mama (2019), Prati Roju Pandage (2019), Thiruchitrambalam (2022), Sardar (2022) and established herself as one of the leading actresses in Telugu and Tamil cinema. Khanna has also sung a few songs for films.

Early life 
Khanna was born on 30 November 1990 and hails from Delhi. She did her schooling at St. Mark's Senior Secondary Public School, Delhi and graduated with a Bachelor of Arts with honours in English at Lady Shri Ram College, Delhi.

According to Khanna, she was an academic topper who was extremely studious, geek during her schooling and college days. When Khanna was young, she wanted to become a singer but as she grew up, she was more interested into studying and aspired to become an IAS officer. Khanna claims that she neither had interest in modelling nor thought of becoming an actress and it was her destiny that made her an actress. During her college days, she tried a hand at copywriting for advertisements, before she made her venture into acting in various advertisements prior to films.

Career

Debut and rise in Telugu cinema (2013–2015) 
Khanna made her on-screen debut with a supporting role in the 2013 Hindi political spy thriller film Madras Cafe directed by Shoojit Sircar, where she played the role of Ruby Singh, the wife of an Indian intelligence officer portrayed by John Abraham, who was also the producer. She had to undergo acting workshops before taking up the role. The film—particularly the story and direction—impressed most Indian critics. Reviewing the film, Saibal Chatterjee of NDTV stated that Khanna "makes an impact in a brief but significant appearance". Madras Cafe was a box-office hit grossing more than 100 crore.

Impressed with her performance in Madras Cafe, actor Srinivas Avasarala approached her for the female lead role in his directorial debut Oohalu Gusagusalade, which also featured himself and Naga Shaurya in the lead roles, which she signed in late October 2013 after considering many other south films, adding that the scope of performing made her sign the film. Khanna initially felt that it would be more of a dancing role with little scope for acting when approached for narration, but found her character practically in every scene in the film. She called her character Prabhavati as a grey, stubborn, arrogant girl but in a lovable way, which she claimed to be very different from what she was in real life except for the fact that she hails from Delhi. Khanna confirmed in early April 2014 that she appeared in a small role in the Telugu film Manam, which had its theatrical release before Oohalu Gusagusalade. Oohalu Gusagusalade opened to positive reviews from critics and Khanna received praise for her work. Sangeetha Devi Dundoo of The Hindu called her an "actor with potential", while Hemanth Kumar of The Times of India stated that she gave a "commendable" performance which helped the movie to some extent. The film was a commercial success at the box office.

Her next Telugu film was Joru, directed by Kumar Nagendra opposite Sundeep Kishan, which she signed after Madras Cafe and while shooting for Oohalu Gusagusalade. She played the role of Annapurna, whom Khanna described as a "modern yet traditional" girl who "is highly emotional and cries at the drop of a hat", which she called the exact opposite of the character of Prabhavati she played in her previous film. Sangeetha Devi Dundoo of The Hindu stated that she provides solace along with Kishan, Brahmanandam and Saptagiri in a film which was "let down by incoherent writing and amateurish execution".  Joru was a commercial failure at the box office.

Khanna's next was Jil, directed by Radha Krishna Kumar opposite Gopichand, which she signed in early July 2014 after the makers approached her considering her performance in Oohalu Gusagusalade. The film received mixed reviews from the critics. In early May 2015, she was signed for the film Shivam alongside Ram Pothineni. The film received negative reviews from the critics and performed poorly at the box office.

Success and further venture into other languages (2015–present) 
Her next release was Bengal Tiger opposite Ravi Teja directed by Sampath Nandi. The film opened to mixed reviews but was commercially successful at the box office. It grossed  globally and became the 8th highest grossing Telugu film of 2015.

In 2016, her first release was Supreme, in which she starred alongside Sai Dharam Tej, and was a commercial success, with critics praising her comic-timing in her performance as Bellam Sridevi, a cop who gets into hilarious situations. Her next release was Hyper, opposite Ram Pothineni for the second time which opened to mixed reviews and was an average grosser at the box office.

In 2017, her first release was Jai Lava Kusa, opposite N. T. Rama Rao Jr. which opened to positive reviews and became a box office hit by grossing more than 100 crore. Later she made her Malayalam debut with Villain, starring Mohanlal and Vishal, directed by B. Unnikrishnan where she essayed a cop in the movie. The movie opened to positive reviews with critics praising her performance as a tough, investigating cop and the movie had a good run at box-office. Her last release of 2017 was Oxygen, marking her second collaboration with Gopichand, opening to mixed reviews and the movie went on to be an average grosser at the box office. In 2018, her first release was Touch Chesi Chudu, marking her second collaboration with Ravi Teja. Though the movie went on a huge hype pre-release, it later opened from mixed to negative reviews and was unsuccessful at the box office. Within a span of a week, her next release was Tholi Prema opposite Varun Tej, which opened to widespread acclaim from critics and audience alike, with critics praising her performance as Varsha as her best ever performance, and also applauded the chemistry between the lead pair. Her next release was Srinivasa Kalyanam, opposite Nithiin, directed by National Award winner Satish Vegesna which opened to mixed reviews but the chemistry between the lead pair was appreciated. Her next release was a multi-starrer Imaikkaa Nodigal, marking her debut in Tamil cinema opening to highly positive reviews with critics praising her performance as a girl-next-door character and was commercially successful at box office. Her next release in Tamil was Adanga Maru, opposite Jayam Ravi which received positive reviews from the critics and became a commercial success at the box office.

In 2019, Her first release was Ayogya opposite Vishal, which was an official remake of the 2015 Telugu hit, Temper which received generally positive reviews from audience and critics. The film did considerably well at the box-office. Her next release was Sangathamizhan opposite Vijay Sethupathi which opened to mixed reviews, but Khanna received praise for her performance. In December 2019, She had two releases, Venky Mama opposite Naga Chaitanya and Venkatesh which received mixed reviews and Prati Roju Pandage marking her second collaboration with Sai Dharam Tej, which received generally positive reviews with critics praising her comic-timing in her performance as "Angel" Aarna, a highly self-obsessed girl from the village town, Rajahmundry. Both the films were commercially successful at the box office.

Her only release in 2020 was World Famous Lover opposite Vijay Deverakonda which opened to negative reviews and did not perform well at the box office.

In 2021, Her first release was Tughlaq Durbar marking her second collaboration with Vijay Sethupathi. The film did not opt for a theatrical release and had its direct television premiere prior to an OTT release. The film received mixed reviews from the critics. In October 2021, Khanna had two of her movies released. The first release was Bhramam opposite Prithviraj Sukumaran which had a direct OTT release only in India and an overseas theatrical release. The film was a Malayalam remake of the 2018 Hindi film Andhadhun. The film received generally positive reviews from the critics. Her next release in the same month was Aranmanai 3 opposite Arya. Despite receiving mixed to negative reviews from critics, The film was a commercial success at the box office.

In 2022, Khanna's first release was Rudra: The Edge of Darkness alongside Ajay Devgn, which also marks her digital streaming debut. It is an adaptation of the British TV show Luther. The web series opened to highly positive reviews from the critics. In July 2022, Khanna had two releases. The first release was Pakka Commercial, marking her third collaboration with Gopichand. The film received mixed reviews from the critics upon its release. The next release in the same month was Thank You, marking her second collaboration with Naga Chaitanya. The movie received mixed to negative reviews upon release, but Khanna's performance as a "mature and stifled woman" was appreciated. Both the films had poor runs at the box-office. Her next release in August 2022 was Thiruchitrambalam starring Dhanush. The film received rave reviews upon its release, with critics appreciating the performances of the cast of the film. Thiruchitrambalam became a box-office hit by grossing more than 100 crore worldwide. Her next release in October was Sardar opposite Karthi. The film opened to rave reviews from the audience and critics alike upon its release. Sardar went on to become the second 100 crore worldwide grosser for Khanna within the same calendar year.

In 2023, Khanna's first release was Farzi, which is directed by Raj Nidimoru and Krishna D.K. of The Family Man fame, alongside Shahid Kapoor and Vijay Sethupathi. The series opened to mostly positive reviews from the critics.

Upcoming projects
, Khanna is shooting for a Hindi film Yodha starring Sidharth Malhotra. Khanna has also signed a Telugu film alongside Sharwanand, tentatively titled as Sharwanand33 by the film's production houseand a Tamil film Aranmanai 4. 

She is due with the release of Shaitan Ka Bachcha opposite Siddharth.

Filmography

Films

Web series

Discography

Awards and nominations

Notes

References

External links 

 
 

1990 births
Living people
Actresses from New Delhi
Indian film actresses
Indian web series actresses
Actresses in Hindi cinema
Actresses in Malayalam cinema
Actresses in Tamil cinema
Actresses in Telugu cinema
Female models from Delhi
Lady Shri Ram College alumni
South Indian International Movie Awards winners
Zee Cine Awards Telugu winners
CineMAA Awards winners
21st-century Indian actresses